Frank Merriwell is a fictional character appearing in a series of novels and short stories by Gilbert Patten, who wrote under the pseudonym Burt L. Standish. The character appeared in over 300 dime novels between 1896 and 1930 (some between 1927 and 1930 were written by other authors with the same pen name), numerous radio dramas in 1934 and again from 1946 through 1949, a comic strip from 1928 through 1936, a comic book (four issues) Frank Merriwell At Yale, and a 12-chapter serialized film in 1936. The book series was relaunched (with a different author) in 1965, but only three books were published.

Character

The model for all later American juvenile sports fiction, Merriwell excelled at football, baseball, basketball, crew and track at Yale while solving mysteries and righting wrongs. He played with great strength and received traumatic blows without injury.

A biographical entry on Patten noted dryly that Frank Merriwell "had little in common with his creator or his readers." Patten offered some background on his character: "The name was symbolic of the chief characteristics I desired my hero to have. Frank for frankness, merry for a happy disposition, well for health and abounding vitality."

Merriwell's classmates observed, "He never drinks. That's how he keeps himself in such fine condition all the time. He will not smoke, either, and he takes his exercise regularly. He is really a remarkable freshie." American Olympic champion boxer and bobsledder Eddie Eagan commented in his autobiography: "To this day I have never used tobacco, because Frank Merriwell didn't. My first glass of wine, which I do not care for, was taken under social compulsion in Europe. Frank never drank."

Merriwell originally appeared in a series of magazine stories starting April 18, 1896 ("Frank Merriwell: or, First Days at Fardale") in Tip Top Weekly, continuing through 1912, and later in dime novels and comic books. Patten would confine himself to a hotel room for a week to write an entire story.

The Frank Merriwell comic strip began in 1928, continuing until 1936. Daily strips from 1934 provided illustrations for the 1937 Big Little Book.

There are at least two generations of Merriwells: Frank, his half-brother Dick, and Frank's son, Frank Jr. There is a marked difference between Frank and Dick. Frank usually handles challenges on his own. Dick has mysterious friends and skills that help him, especially an old Indian friend without whom the stories would not be quite as interesting.

Syndicated comic strips 
The McClure Newspaper Syndicate distributed Young Frank Merriwell, written by Patten and illustrated by John Hix; it debuted on March 26, 1928, and ran for six months. The comic strip was resurrected in July 1931 as Frank Merriwell's Schooldays (this time syndicated by the Central Press Association and illustrated by Jack Wilhelm) and ran for three years.

Radio
The Adventures of Frank Merriwell first ran on NBC radio from March 26 to June 22, 1934, as a 15-minute serial airing three times a week at 5:30pm. Sponsored by Dr. West's Toothpaste, this program starred Donald Briggs in the title role. Harlow Wilcox was the announcer.

After a 12-year gap, the series returned October 5, 1946 as a 30-minute Saturday morning show on NBC, continuing until June 4, 1949. Lawson Zerbe starred as Merriwell, Jean Gillespie and Elaine Rostas as Inza Burrage, Harold Studer as Bart Hodge and Patricia Hosley as Elsie Belwood. Announcers were Mel Brandt and Harlow Wilcox, and the Paul Taubman Orchestra supplied the background music.

Yale's Alma Mater, "Bright College Years", was the theme song.

Film
A film serial entitled The Adventures of Frank Merriwell was created by Universal Studios in 1936.

Broadway
A Broadway musical called Frank Merriwell, or Honor Unchallenged, opened at the Longacre Theatre on April 24, 1971. It closed after one performance.

1965 relaunch
In 1965, a new book series was launched by author Mike Frederic, with cover tagline "The thrilling sequel to the all-time best-selling American sports series." Only three books were published: Frank Merriwell Returns (baseball theme, 1965), Frank Merriwell Quarterback (American football theme, 1965), and Frank Merriwell At The Wheel (sports car racing theme, 1967).

Book titles

Listen to

Zoot Radio, free old time radio show downloads of 'Frank Merriwell'

References

External links 

Tip Top Weekly on Nickels and Dimes, Northern Illinois University's dime novel online database.
Tip Top Weekly (January 6, 1900): "Frank Merriwell's Limit (full text) 
Adventures of Frank Merriwell collection, at the New York Public Library for the Performing Arts
 

Book series introduced in 1896
Characters in American novels of the 19th century
Characters in American novels of the 20th century
Fictional Yale University people
Literary characters introduced in 1896
Frank Merriwell
Frank Merriwell
Frank Merriwell